Utetheisa externa is a moth in the family Erebidae. It was described by Charles Swinhoe in 1917. It is found on the Bacan Islands of Indonesia.

References

Moths described in 1917
externa